E3 ubiquitin-protein ligase RNF123 is an enzyme that in humans is encoded by the RNF123 gene.

The protein encoded by this gene contains a RING finger, a motif present in a variety of functionally distinct proteins and known to be involved in protein-protein and protein-DNA interactions. Increased expression of the gene has been associated with laminopathies, and in degradation of chromatin associated proteins such as HP1 (Chaturvedi et al, 2012, PMID: 23077635).

See also
 RING finger domain

References

Further reading

External links 
 

RING finger proteins